Naiyobi is an administrative ward in the Ngorongoro District of the Arusha Region of Tanzania. In 2016 the Tanzania National Bureau of Statistics report there were 10,191 people in the ward, from 9,133 in 2012.

References

Ngorongoro District
Wards of Arusha Region